France is a European Parliament constituency for elections in the European Union covering the member state of France. It is currently represented by 79 Members of the European Parliament. From 2004 until 2019, eight subdivided constituencies represented France in the European Parliament.

Current Members of the European Parliament

Elections

1979

The 1979 European election was the first direct election to the European Parliament to be held and hence the first time France had voted.

1984

The 1989 European election was the second election to the European Parliament and the second for France.

1989

The 1989 European election was the third election to the European Parliament and the third for France.

1994

The 1994 European election was the fourth election to the European Parliament and the fourth for France.

1999

The 1999 European election was the fifth election to the European Parliament and the fifth for France.

2019

The 2019 European election was the ninth election to the European Parliament and the sixth for France.

References

External links
 European Election News by European Election Law Association (Eurela)

European Parliament constituencies in France
Former constituencies
1979 establishments in France
2019 establishments in France
2004 disestablishments in France
Constituencies established in 1979
Constituencies established in 2019
Constituencies disestablished in 2004